The manacled sculpin (Synchirus gilli) is a species of marine ray-finned fish belonging to the family Cottidae, the typical sculpins. This fish is found in the eastern Pacific Ocean where it occurs along the coast from Alaska to southern California.  This species grows to a length of  TL.  This species is the only known member of its genus.

References

Cottinae
Monotypic fish genera
Fish described in 1890